Panton may refer to:

Places
Pantón, a municipality of northwestern Spain 
Panton, Lincolnshire 
Panton, Vermont
Panton Hill, Victoria
Panton Arms Hotel, Pentraeth, a hotel in Anglesey

Other uses
Panton (surname)
Panton Hill Football Club
Panton, Leslie & Company
Panton–Valentine leukocidin
Panton Records, a Czech record label

See also
Pantone (disambiguation)
Pantonality (disambiguation)